Carleton St Peter is a hamlet and civil parish in South Norfolk approximately  south-east of Norwich.

The church cannot be reached by road and sits in a small graveyard in the middle of a field reached by a short path between ploughed fields. The tower contains four bells but they cannot be rung.

The parish extends northwards to include the Beauchamp Arms public house on the south bank of the River Yare and the nearby Buckenham Sailing Club. These lie at the end of Ferry Road although the ferry across to Buckenham on the north bank stopped running before World War II.

Between Carleton St Peter and Claxton, on the banks of Carleton Beck, lies Ducan's Marsh, a Site of Special Scientific Interest and one of the richest areas of unimproved wet grassland in East Norfolk.

References

External links

St Peter's Church
Buckenham Sailing Club
Buckenham Ferry, 1893
Buckenham Ferry 1930
Beauchamp Arms Hotel, c1960

Hamlets in Norfolk
South Norfolk
Civil parishes in Norfolk